Pongtawat "Ian" Chalermkittichai, known in English as Ian Kittichai (born 27 January 1968), is a Thai chef, restaurateur, and cookbook writer. He and his restaurant, Issaya Siamese Club in Bangkok, Thailand, have earned acclaim from the New York Times, Food & Wine, Travel + Leisure and other publications. Issaya Siamese Club has been listed on Asia’s 50 Best Restaurants, a division of The World's 50 Best Restaurants, most recently ranked number 39 in 2018. Australian Traveller magazine listed Issaya Siamese Club as one of the world’s hottest restaurants in 2018.

Kittichai’s cookbook Issaya Siamese Club: Innovative Thai Cuisine by Chef Ian Kittichai, released in April 2013, placed first in the Best Authors and Chefs category for Thailand, and third for the Best Cookbook of The Year in the Gourmand World Cookbook Awards 2014 held in Beijing in May 2014.

In 2006 and 2012 Kittichai appeared on the television show Iron Chef America to compete with Mario Batali and Marc Forgione respectively. He also appears regularly on Iron Chef Thailand as well as MasterChef Thailand and MasterChef Junior Thailand.

Early life and career
As a child growing up in Bangkok, Kittichai accompanied his mother on daily trips to local markets before school, and then sold her curry rice from a cart after school.

While a student in London, Kittichai worked part-time at London's Waldorf Hotel, whose management paid for him to attend cooking school at Southeast London Colleges for two years. He then moved to Sydney, where he apprenticed at Claude’s French restaurant in the mid-1980s and attended culinary school at Sydney Technical College.

After returning to his home in Bangkok, Kittichai was hired at the Four Seasons Bangkok (now Anantara Siam Bangkok Hotel), where he eventually became the world’s first Thai to be named executive chef of an international five-star hotel, in charge of the Four Seasons’ Thai, Italian, and Japanese dining outlets.

In 2003, Kittichai opened Kittichai, a modern Thai restaurant in New York's SIXTY Soho (formerly 60 Thompson) which earned a listing in Travel + Leisure magazine’s Best New American Restaurants 2004. The following year, Food & Wine called Kittichai the best Thai restaurant in America, praising the elegant décor as well as the cuisine.

In 2011, Kittichai established Issaya Siamese Club, a contemporary Thai restaurant in a 100-year-old villa in Bangkok. The restaurant has made Asia’s 50 Best Restaurants, a list produced by UK media company William Reed Business Media, based on a poll of international chefs, restaurateurs, gourmands and restaurant critics. Most recently the restaurant was ranked number 39 in 2018. Traveller magazine in Australia also listed Issaya Siamese Club as one of the world’s hottest restaurants in 2018.

That same year, Kittichai opened his second New York eatery, Spot Dessert Bar, where the chef’s skill with pastries and desserts is showcased. Among the dessert “tapas” at Spot Dessert Bar is “The Harvest”, a combination of crumbled cookie and cake layered with fruits and cream to resemble a potted house plant. A second location for Spot Dessert Bar was established in New York’s Koreatown in 2012 and a Flushing location opened in 2016.

In Bangkok, Kittichai joined Thai chef Arisara Chongphanitkul, who had been his pastry chef at Issaya Siamese Club, to open Issaya La Patisserie at Central Embassy mall in 2014. Dedicated to pastry, dessert, and sweet creations blending Thai and international influences, the patisserie is now located in EmQuartier mall’s Helix Tower.

The same year, the chef took over the cuisine at Tangerine restaurant at Resorts World Sentosa, Singapore, focusing on a farm-to-table menu featuring both classic and contemporary Thai flavors.

Also in 2014, Kittichai established Issaya Cooking Studio in Bangkok’s Central Embassy mall. Courses at the 170-square-meter cooking school facility range from classical and basic Thai cuisine to molecular and modern culinary technique, and from beginner to professional chef levels. The school is aimed at clients who are already familiar with Thai cooking.

Kittichai also co-owns Bangkok’s Namsaah Bottling Trust, a gastropub located in a 20th-century villa previously used as a soda producer’s bottling office in the city’s Silom district, and for which he designed a contemporary Asian menu.

To coordinate Kittichai’s restaurant interests and consultative contracts around the globe, the chef and his wife Sarah Kittichai operate Cuisine Concept Co. Ltd., an international food and beverage industry consulting firm.

Bibliography
Kittichai, Ian. Issaya Siamese Club Cookbook: Innovative Thai Cuisine by Chef Ian Kittichai Avril Production, 2013  
Kittichai, Ian and Chongphanitkul Apisara. La Patisserie Issaya Pastry Cookbook Avril Production, 2016. 
Kittichai, Ian. Chef Ian’s Kitchen Revealed Amarin Cuisine, 2011

References

External links
 
 Issaya Siamese Club
 Issaya Cooking Studio
 Namsaah Bottling Trust
 Spot Dessert Bar
 Tangerine
 Cuisine Concept

Ian Kittichai
Male chefs
Ian Kittichai
Ian Kittichai
Living people
1968 births